SM UB-124 was a German Type UB III submarine or U-boat in the German Imperial Navy during World War I. She was commissioned into the German Imperial Navy on 22 April 1918 as SM UB-124.

Construction

She was built by AG Weser of Bremen and, following just under a year of construction, launched at Bremen on 19 March 1918. UB-124 was commissioned later the same year under the command of Oblt.z.S. Hans Oscar Wutsdorff. Like all Type UB III submarines, UB-124 carried ten torpedoes and was armed with an  deck gun. UB-124 had a displacement of  while surfaced and  when submerged. Her engines enabled her to travel at  when surfaced and  when submerged.

Summary of raiding history

References

Notes

Citations

Bibliography 

 

German Type UB III submarines
World War I submarines of Germany
U-boats commissioned in 1918
1918 ships
Ships built in Bremen (state)
Maritime incidents in 1918
U-boats sunk in 1918
U-boats sunk by depth charges
U-boats sunk by British warships
World War I shipwrecks in the Irish Sea